Elias Deemer (January 3, 1838 – March 29, 1918) was a Republican member of the U.S. House of Representatives from Pennsylvania.

Biography
Elias Deemer was born near Durham, Pennsylvania.  He was engaged in the mercantile business in Lycoming County, Pennsylvania and in Philadelphia in 1860.  During the Civil War, he enlisted in July 1861 as a private in Company E, One Hundred and Fourth Regiment, Pennsylvania Volunteers, and served until the middle of May 1862, when he was discharged because of disabilities.  He moved to Milford, New Jersey, in 1862 and engaged in business.  In 1868 moved to Williamsport, Pennsylvania, and engaged in the manufacture of lumber.  He served as president of the common council from 1888 to 1890.  He was president of the Williamsport National Bank from 1893 to 1918, and also interested in the publication of several newspapers at Williamsport.  He was a delegate to the 1896 Republican National Convention.

Deemer was elected as a Republican to the Fifty-seventh, Fifty-eighth, and Fifty-ninth Congresses.  He was an unsuccessful candidate for reelection in 1906, for election in 1908.  He resumed lumber operations in Pennsylvania, and at Deemer, Mississippi, an unincorporated town he founded, and which was named for him.  Deemer is just south of Philadelphia, Mississippi in Neshoba County.

He died at his home in Williamsport, Pennsylvania on March 29, 1918. Interment in Wildwood Cemetery.

Sources

The Political Graveyard

1838 births
1918 deaths
People from Milford, New Jersey
Politicians from Williamsport, Pennsylvania
People of Pennsylvania in the American Civil War
American city founders
Republican Party members of the United States House of Representatives from Pennsylvania
19th-century American politicians